Nadine Poss (born 1991), from Windesheim in the German wine region of Nahe, was chosen as the 65th German Wine Queen on 13 Sep 2013 in Offenburg, as the successor to Julia Bertram from the Ahr wine region. She thus became the eighth German Wine Queen from the Nahe. The wine princesses during her twelve-month reign are Ramona Diegel (Rheinhessen) and Sabine Wagner (Rheingau). The German Wine Queen is traditionally crowned in the town of Neustadt an der Weinstraße. By exception that year the ceremony took place in Offenburg. The occasion was the 100th anniversary of the Baden Vintners' Association.

Life 
Nadine Poss was born on 8 May 1991 and grew up in Windesheim in the county of Bad Kreuznach at her parents' vineyard, the Weingut Poss, which is one of the leading Burgundy vineyards in the  Nahe valley. From 1997 to 2001 she went to the primary school in Guldental and from 2001 to 2010 to the Alfred Delp School in Hargesheim. After her Abitur exams she went to Spain for six months, where she lived with an Andalusian family and went to school locally to learn Spanish.
   
In 2010 she underwent a placement  in wine exporting at Schloss Johannisberg and the Bingen winery of Reh Kendermann. Since 2011 she has been studying international winemaking at the Hochschule Geisenheim. She sees her future at her parents vineyard.

On 10 Nov 2012 she was elected as the regional wine queen of the Nahe valley.

As Germany's national wine ambassador, Poss has travelled around the world in her role promoting German wines. In June 2014 she helped to launch the "Riesling Weeks" campaign in Hong Kong, joining the Consul General of Germany at a special dinner to celebrate the event. Later that month, Poss was in Canada to host "Generation Riesling" in Vancouver,  and, in July 2014, Poss hosted the "Summer of Riesling Concert Cruise" in New York Harbor as part of the "31 Days of German Riesling" in the United States.

In Jan 2015 she was interviewed by Cru Magazine, who described her as "the representative of the German wine industry."

References

External links 
 The family vineyard
 2013 Wine Queen Competition: Candidate Nadine Poss from the Nahe at deutscheweine.de
 Official website of the German Wine Queen
Allgemeine Zeitung:
Keine Angst vor steilen Klippen – Hobby-Bergsteigerin Nadine Poss aus Windesheim zieht souverän ins Finale ein by Thomas Ehlke on 9 Sep 2013
Vom Fernweh fasziniert – Nadine Poss aus Windesheim stellt sich der Wahl by Beate Vogt-Gladigau on 7 Nov 2012

German wine
1991 births
People from Bad Kreuznach (district)
Living people
German Wine Queens
German women